Antonio Medina y Céspedes (1824–1885) was an Afro-Cuban poet and playwright, "among the most outstanding black intellectual figures of his time."

Life
Born to free parents in Havana, Medina received elementary school education before working as a tailor. Work at the Tacón Theater introduced him to Havana's literary and theatrical scene, and he befriended the Afro-Cuban poets Gabriel de la Concepción Valdés and Juan Francisco Manzano. In 1842 he helped found El Faro, Havana's first newspaper for people of color. Pursuing an education, Medina qualified as an elementary schoolteacher in 1850. He founded a school for people of color, Nuestra Señora de los Desamparados (Our Lady of the Abandoned), and directed it until 1878. In 1856 he and Anselmo Font founded the first black Cuban literary journal, El Rocio, although only one issue was published.

Works
 Poesías, 1851
 Dona Canuto de Ceibamocha o El Guajiro Generoso, 1858
 Jacobo Girondi, 1880
 Lodoiska o la maldicion, 1882

References

1824 births
1885 deaths
19th-century Cuban poets
Cuban dramatists and playwrights
Writers from Havana
Cuban educators
Cuban journalists
19th-century dramatists and playwrights
19th-century Cuban writers
19th-century Cuban educators